All Music Guide to the Blues: The Definitive Guide to the Blues is a non-fiction, encyclopedic referencing of blues music compiled under the direction of All Media Guide.

Content
The book's third edition was released in April 2003 and was edited by Vladimir Bogdanov, Chris Woodstra and Stephen Thomas Erlewine.

The book's back cover touts that the book contains ratings for close to 9,000 album and 935 musician biographies. Artists are set up alphabetically and include some of the following: birth and death dates, classification (vocals, guitar, drums, etc.), a biography, a discography. The discography listings include a five star rating, the music label it was released on, and the date as well as possibly reviews of certain albums.

All Music Guide to the Blues also includes 30 essays covering different styles of blues, along with "top lists" and extensive charts on the evolution and lineage of the blues.

See also
 AllMusic

External links
 Listing at Backbeat Books.
 All Music Guide to the Blues - Review - book review by B. Lee Cooper
 Book review - All Music Guide to The Blues - 3rd Edition by Craig Ruskey

A
Blues mass media
Encyclopedias of music
Music guides
Music textbooks
2003 non-fiction books